The 1891–92 Football League was the fourth season of English league football, and the last season of the football league running in a single division. Sunderland were the winners of the league which was their first ever league success. At the beginning of the season Stoke had left the Football Alliance and rejoined the Football League. Darwen also joined from the Alliance but they conceded 112 goals and finished bottom.

Final league table
The table below is reproduced here in the exact form that it can be found at the Rec.Sport.Soccer Statistics Foundation website and in Rothmans Book of Football League Records 1888–89 to 1978–79, with home and away statistics separated.

Beginning with the season 1894–95, clubs finishing level on points were separated according to goal average (goals scored divided by goals conceded). In case one or more teams had the same goal difference, this system favoured those teams who had scored fewer goals. The goal average system was eventually scrapped beginning with the 1976–77 season.

During the first five seasons of the league, that is until the season 1893–94 re-election process concerned the clubs which finished in the bottom four of the league.

Results

Maps

Re-election process
Two clubs were re-elected to the League in the re-election process. West Bromwich Albion, although finishing in the bottom four teams, were not required to seek re-election as they were the FA Cup holders. Two of the other three teams were duly re-elected. As a result, three new teams were elected to the League. The voting went as follows:

When the Second Division was added to the league the following year, Darwen were elected to participate, effectively becoming the first club to be relegated from the First Division to the Second Division. The other teams to participate in the Second Division were drawn from the Football Alliance except for Birmingham St. George's, who left and was replaced with Sheffield United of the Northern League.

References

See also

1891–92 in English football
1891 in association football
1892 in association football

English Football League seasons
1891–92 in English association football leagues